Diego de la Tejera Farías (born 26 April 1995) is a Mexican footballer who plays as a midfielder for Celaya of the Ascenso MX on loan from Club León.

Career
De La Tejera early career started at FC Dallas where he played 3 years and then move to Leon where he made his debut in the Liga MX against Toluca FC and in Copa MX against Correcaminos playing some minutes and leaving some really good impressions. De la Tejera joined Celaya before the 2017 Apertura tournament and made his Ascenco MX debut in an away match against Querétaro.

References

External links

Mexican footballers
Sportspeople from León, Guanajuato
Footballers from Guanajuato
1995 births
Living people
Association football midfielders
Club Celaya footballers
Club León footballers